India and Lesotho maintain diplomatic relations. Lesotho has a high commission in New Delhi and India has a non resident ambassador in Pretoria, South Africa. Both nations are part of the Non-Aligned Movement and the Commonwealth of Nations.

"Considering that India is the largest democracy in the world, and in view of its past contributions to the promotion of peace", Lesotho has officially decided to back India's candidacy for a permanent seat in a reformed Security Council. Lesotho has also recognised Kashmir as an integral part of India, and supports the Indian stand on this issue. According to the Indian High Commission to Pretoria's website, "Since 1996, the High Commission in Pretoria has been concurrently accredited to Lesotho. Earlier, Lesotho came under the charge of the High Commission in Botswana. Following the visit of Prime Minister Mosisili to India in August 2003, Lesotho opened a resident mission in New Delhi. Mr. Shabir Peerbhai was appointed as Lesotho’s High Commissioner to India." Shri Man Mohan Bakaya has been appointed the Honorary Consul of India to the Kingdom of Lesotho in March 2014 in a ceremony held in the Lesotho capital Maseru, by the Indian High Commissioner to South Africa (accredited to Lesotho).

Economic ties 
In the year 2010–2011, Indian exports to Lesotho were valued at around US$17 million and imports at only US$1 million.

Military ties
In 2001, under an agreement with India, an Indian Army Training Team (IATT) started training the LDF.

References

Lesotho
Lesotho
Bilateral relations of Lesotho
Lesotho
India